Perebea is a genus of plant in family Moraceae.

Selected species
 P. angustifolia (Poepp. & Endl.) C.C.Berg
 P. glabrifolia (Ducke) C.C.Berg.*
 P. guianensis Aubl. (type)
 P. hispidula Standl.
 P. humilis C.C.Berg
 P. longepedunculata C.C.Berg
 P. mennegae C.C.Berg
 P. mollis (Poepp. & Endl.) Huber
 P. rubra (Trécul) C.C.Berg
 P. tessmannii Mildbr.
 P. xanthochyma H.Karst.
 List sources :
 * This species is a synonym of P. rubra subsp. glabrifolia

References

External links
Original genus description by Fusée Aublet
Illustration of Perebea guianensis (as Castilla australis Hemsley) from Hooker’s Icones Plantarum, vol. 27: t. 2676 (1901)

 
Taxonomy articles created by Polbot
Moraceae genera